Kisenso is a municipality (commune) in the Mont Amba district of Kinshasa, the capital city of the Democratic Republic of the Congo.

References

Communes of Kinshasa
Mont Amba District